Abercromby Professorship of Archaeology is a chair at the University of Edinburgh. It was endowed in the will of John Abercromby, 5th Baron Abercromby (1841–1924), who left instructions to establish a chair in prehistoric archaeology at the university. With the new post having been advertised, it was filled for the first time in 1927 by V. Gordon Childe. Abercromby's will set out the focus of the chair and requirements of its holder: they should be knowledgable of the prehistory of Europe and of the Near East, and that the professor would be actively involved in archaeology research.

List of Abercromby Professors of Archaeology

 1927–1946: V. Gordon Childe
 1946–1977: Stuart Piggott
 1977–2007: Dennis Harding
 2007–2012: vacant
 2012–2019: Ian Ralston
 2019–2022: vacant
2022-present: Manuel Fernández-Götz

References

Archaeology, Abercromby
Archaeology, Abercromby, Edinburgh
Prehistory